Jordan Garrett (born December 17, 1992) is an American actor.

Garrett has made guest appearances in numerous television shows, including Law & Order: SVU, Crossing Jordan, Criminal Minds, Six Feet Under, Medium, Hidden Hills, ER, and Without a Trace.  He auditioned for the lead role in the 2006 movie Saving Shiloh, but lost the part to Jason Dolley, instead being cast in a supporting role. Garrett appeared in Death Sentence, as teenager Luke Hume, and The Least of These.

Filmography
Law & Order: Special Victims Unit (season 6 episode 6)
The Least of These (2008)
Death Sentence (2007)
Saving Shiloh (2006)
Thank You for Smoking (2006)
Totally Baked: A Pot-U-Mentary
Sixty Minute Man
Junior Pilot
Sevens Eleven
Medium
Easy
Hidden Agenda
By Appointment Only
Melissa and Joey
CSI: Miami (seasons 6 episode 10)

References

External links

1992 births
Living people
American male child actors
Place of birth missing (living people)